Polovinkino is a rural locality (a selo) and the administrative center of Polovinkinsky Selsoviet of Rubtsovsky District, Altai Krai, Russia. The population was 1,103 in 2016. There are 14 streets.

Geography 
Polovinkino is located 12 km south of Rubtsovsk (the district's administrative centre) by road. Rubtsovsk and Samarka are the nearest rural localities.

References 

Rural localities in Rubtsovsky District